Francisco Pineda is a Salvadoran environmentalist. He was awarded the Goldman Environmental Prize in 2011, for his efforts on protection of water resources in El Salvador against pollution from mining projects.

He resides in San Isidro, Cabañas.

References 

Date of birth unknown
Living people
Salvadoran environmentalists
Goldman Environmental Prize awardees
Year of birth missing (living people)